Variku is a neighbourhood of Tartu, Estonia.

References

Tartu